The 2019 CONCACAF U-17 Championship was the 6th edition of the CONCACAF Under-17 Championship (19th edition if all eras included), the men's under-17 international football tournament organized by CONCACAF. It was hosted in the United States between 1 May and 16 May 2019. The top four teams qualified for the 2019 FIFA U-17 World Cup in Brazil as CONCACAF representatives.

Mexico were the defending champions, and successfully won a fourth consecutive title.

Qualified teams

The format for qualification had changed since the 2017 edition. The qualifying competition no longer featured Caribbean and Central American zones.

The 41 CONCACAF teams were ranked based on the CONCACAF Men’s Under-17 Ranking as of May 2017. A total of 35 teams entered the tournament. The sixteen highest-ranked entrants were exempt from qualifying and advanced directly to the group stage of the final tournament, while the lowest-ranked nineteen entrants had to participate in qualifying, where the four group winners advanced to the round of 16 of the knockout stage of the final tournament.

Notes

Venues
Matches were played at the IMG Academy in Bradenton, Florida:

Match officials

Referees
 Marco Antonio Ortiz Nava (Mexico)
 Fernando Guerrero (Mexico) 
 Adonai Escobedo (Mexico)
 John Pitti (Panama)
 Iván Barton (El Salvador)
 Ismael Cornejo (El Salvador)
 Henry Bejarano (Costa Rica)
 Juan Gabriel Calderón (Costa Rica)
 Jair Marrufo (United States)
 Armando Villarreal (United States)
 Ismail Elfath (United States)
 Yadel Martinez (Cuba) 
 Mario Escobar (Guatemala)
 Walter López Castellanos (Guatemala)
 Oshane Nation (Jamaica)
 Daneon Parchment (Jamaica)
 Kimbell Ward (Saint Kitts and Nevis) 
 Hector Saíd Martínez (Honduras)

Draw
The draw for the group stage took place on 19 February 2019, 11:00 EST (UTC−5), at the CONCACAF Headquarters in Miami. The sixteen teams were drawn into four groups of four teams. Based on the CONCACAF Men's Under-17 Ranking, the top four ranked teams were seeded into position one of each group, while the remaining twelve teams were distributed in the other pots, as follows:

Squads

Players born on or after 1 January 2002 were eligible to compete.

Group stage
The top three teams in each group advanced to the round of 16, where they were joined by the four teams advancing from the qualifying round.

The teams were ranked according to points (3 points for a win, 1 point for a draw, 0 points for a loss). If tied on points, tiebreakers were applied in the following order:
 Greater number of points in matches between the tied teams;
 Greater goal difference in matches between the tied teams (if more than two teams finished equal on points);
 Greater number of goals scored in matches among the tied teams (if more than two teams finished equal in points);
 Greater goal difference in all group matches;
 Greater number of goals scored in all group matches;
 Drawing of lots.

All times are local, EDT (UTC−4).

Group E

Group F

Group G

Group H

Knockout stage

Bracket

Round of 16

Quarter-finals
The four quarter-final winners qualified for the 2019 FIFA U-17 World Cup.

Semi-finals

Final

Awards

Winners

The following awards were given at the conclusion of the tournament.

Golden Ball 
 Israel Luna

Golden Boot
 Geancarlo Castro (7 goals)

Golden Glove
 Eduardo García

Fair Play

Goalscorers

Qualified teams for FIFA U-17 World Cup
The following four teams from CONCACAF qualified for the 2019 FIFA U-17 World Cup.

1 Bold indicates champions for that year. Italic indicates hosts for that year.

References

External links
Under 17 – Men, CONCACAF.com

 
2019
U-17 Championship
2019 Concacaf U-17 Championship
2019 in youth association football
2019 in sports in Florida
2019 FIFA U-17 World Cup qualification
May 2019 sports events in the United States